The term postal strike or mail strike may refer to:

 U.S. postal strike of 1970
 1971 United Kingdom postal workers strike
 1988 United Kingdom postal workers strike
 2007 Royal Mail industrial disputes
 2009 Royal Mail industrial disputes
 2022 United Kingdom postal workers strikes